, née , was a Japanese novelist and a mystery writer favored as the queen of both mystery novels and tricks in Japan, often compared to Agatha Christie. Her spouse is Takashi Yamamura, a painter and a retired high school teacher. Her younger brother is Hiroshi Kimura, a professor of Political Science and her daughter is Momiji Yamamura, an actress.

Biography

Born in Kyoto, Misa Yamamura graduated from Kyoto Prefectural University Faculty of Letters, majored Japanese Literature in 1957 and was employed as a Japanese literature teacher at Fushimi Junior High School in Kyoto City until 1964  when she got married. Yamamura wrote two TV screen plays before her major debut for a very popular series of detective drama . Those were written for Episodes 474 (co-authored with Norimasa Ogawa) and 476, both broadcast in 1970.

Among her over 70 novels, many were set in Kyoto, and a good number of those were used as the original works for television dramas since 1970s as well as for several theater plays. She incorporated her background into her novels as she held official instructors' license for Ikenobo flower arrangement (6th rank or Jun-kakan) and tea ceremony with a Japanese dance Natori, or an instructor allowed to hold a stage name (Hanayagi school). She appeared in a few TV drama based on her novels cast with Momiji Yamamura.

Misa Yamamura introduced herself to a mystery writer Kyotaro Nishimura before her debut, and their friendship lasted till her unexpected death in 1996. Momiji, her daughter, has also been appearing in a variety of dramas based on novels by Kyotaro Nishimura as well. Many years after she had expired, Nishimura published a biographical novel "A Woman Writer"  with a portrait picture of Misa Yamamura. "A Flowery Coffin"  was originally written in four parts between October 27 and November 17 for a weekly magazine Shūkan Asahi in 2006, and a hard cover with the same title was published in November, 2006. In both titles, the heroine is Natsuko Emoto, a woman mystery writer. Nishimura dedicated those books to Misa Yamamura as he wrote on the band over the book jacket.

On September 5, 1996, she was found dead in the room she had used as her office in Imperial Hotel in Tokyo, due to heart failure at the age of 62 years. Yamamura left a will that her eldest daughter Momiji Yamamura should be given a role whoever a director produces works based on her novels for drama for television or theater.  
Momiji Yamamura has been providing the original plans for TV drama and theatrical works that uses her mother's novels, and it includes those episodes of two-hour TV dramas titled "Misa Yamamura, the Novelist Detective" has been broadcast since 2012, with the leading role portrayed as Misa Yamamura the novelist detective. Momiji is co-starred with the main cast Yūko Asano, who plays Misa Yamamura.

Awards
 1983 Disappeared Heir  at the third Nihon Bungei Taishō

Long lists
 1970 Death at Keijo  at the 16th Edogawa Ranpo Award
 1971 The Corpse Likes Air Conditioner 
 1972 Death Crossover  at the 18th Edogawa Ranpo Award
 1973 Distorted Ocean Trench at the 19th Edogawa Ranpo Award

Bibliography

Serials
 Katherine: 38 episodes , 1975–1995, with the first episode as 
 Maiko Kogiku in Kyoto: 6 episodes , November 1985 – 1995
 Akiko Ishihara, an undertaker: 5 episodes , November 1990 – 1996
 Fuyuko Enatsu, a coroner: 8 episodes , October 1980 – 1996
 Yumi Katayama, a private eye: 4 episodes , June 1984–April 1994 （1986）
 Ayuko Toda, a nurse: 3 episodes , June 1992 – 1993 
 Kayoko Ike, a woman mystery writer: 2 episodes , April 1994–June 1995
 Yoko Imai, a custom inspector: 1 episode , 1987
 Asako Yamura, a woman mystery writer, TV news caster: 1 episode , 1983
 Asako Ogawa, a female college student-hosutesu: 1 episode , May 1984
 Asako Sawaki, a woman mystery writer: 8 episodes , May 1989 – 1994

Single titles
 Disappeared in the Sea of Melaka  January, 1974.
 The Corpse Likes Air Conditioner  June, 1976
 78 titles between October 1976 and July 1997 (unfinished)
 3 titles published post mortem between September 1998 and December 2002.

Misa Yamamura Anthology

10 volumes published between 1989 and 1990

Essays
 Mystery of Love by Misa , 1985
 In Love with Mystery Novels , 1992

Screen plays
 SWAT: 2 episodes, 1970 

Episode 474 "Chain of Blood"  for December 2, 1970. (Co-authored with Norimasa Ogawa.)

Episode 476 "An Odd Couple"  for December 16, 1970.

Original stories
Manga
A series of five manga books published by Akita Shoten including:

 
Adventure computer games

 Taito: 2 titles, 
 Hect: 
 Nagzat: 
 Pack-In-Video: 
Nintendo DS
 Tecmo: :ja:DS山村美紗サスペンス 舞妓小菊・記者キャサリン・葬儀屋石原明子 古都に舞う花三輪 京都殺人事件ファイル

Translated titles
 
 
 , also known as "T︠S︡vety smerti: sbornik zhenskogo detektiva" (T︠S︡vety death: a collection of female detective.)
 
 

 
 

  (From the series of "Asako Yamura, a woman mystery writer, TV news caster"）
Others

See also 
 Kyotaro Nishimura
 Momiji Yamamura

Notes

References

External links 
 Misa Yamamura Official Page

1934 births
1996 deaths
Japanese novelists
Japanese women novelists
Japanese mystery writers